Abdulin is a masculine surname, commonly found in Azerbaijani, Russian, and Central Asian languages. It is a variant of Abdulayev. Abdulina is the feminine surname counterpart. It is shared by the following people:
Denis Abdulin (born 1985), Russian professional ice hockey forward
Mansur Abdulin (1923–2007), Russian memoirist
Rinat Abdulin (born 1982), Kazakhstani association football player

See also
Abdulino, a town in Orenburg Oblast, Russia
Abdullino, several rural localities in the Republic of Bashkortostan, Russia

References

Notes

Sources
И. М. Ганжина (I. M. Ganzhina). "Словарь современных русских фамилий" (Dictionary of Modern Russian Last Names). Москва, 2001. 

Azerbaijani-language surnames
Kazakh-language surnames
Kyrgyz-language surnames
Russian-language surnames
Tajik-language surnames
Turkmen-language surnames
Uzbek-language surnames
